Stefanie Tücking (1 April 1962 – 1 December 2018) was a German radio and television presenter.

Career
Tücking was born in Kaiserslautern. She won the Golden Camera award at the age of 24 for her work on the ARD music show  (Formula One), where she served as the show host between January 1986 and December 1987. After her breakthrough with Formel Eins, she worked for the German broadcaster Südwestrundfunk (SWR) as a television and radio presenter until her death.

Death
Tücking died unexpectedly during the night of 1 December 2018 in Baden-Baden at age 56. The cause of death was a pulmonary embolism. She was found by a friend in her bed. Tücking had no known health or substance-related problems. According to her father, they visited a Christmas market on Thursday and on Friday (30 November) evening she was on air with her radio for the last time.

References

External links
 
 

German television presenters
German women television presenters
People from Kaiserslautern
1962 births
2018 deaths
Deaths from pulmonary embolism
ARD (broadcaster) people
Südwestrundfunk people